Camden Murphy (born July 23, 1996) is an American professional stock car racing driver. He last competed in the NASCAR Camping World Truck Series, driving the No. 30 Toyota Tundra for On Point Motorsports, and in Monster Jam, driving the Bakugan Dragonoid truck.

Racing career

Early years

Due to the lack of racing opportunities and the large amount of racing pushback in his hometown Chicago area, Murphy often raced in southeastern Wisconsin at tracks like Madison International Speedway and the Milwaukee Mile. Murphy gained substantial attention in 2012 when he won a Midwest Truck Series race at the Mile by way of a three-wide pass. Starting in 2013, Murphy instructed drivers on road courses like Road America and the Daytona International Speedway road course.

NASCAR
Murphy made his NASCAR debut in 2014, driving the No. 08 truck for SS-Green Light Racing in the Camping World Truck Series at Martinsville Speedway.  He finished on the lead lap in 21st while donating sponsorship to the Ronald McDonald House Charities.  Murphy returned to Martinsville again in 2015, driving the No. 1 entry for MAKE Motorsports. Again Murphy posted a lead lap finish, this time in 24th. In 2016, Murphy moved up to the Xfinity Series, turning in a 26th-place finish in Rick Ware Racing's No. 25 entry at Bristol Motor Speedway. Off the merits of that race, Truck team Contreras Motorsports signed Murphy to drive his first NASCAR road course race, at Canadian Tire Motorsport Park in summer 2016. Murphy fell out with clutch problems after completing only three laps of the race in an unsponsored truck.

Murphy made his first intermediate track start in 2017, where he was a field-filler for Copp Motorsports in a Truck race at Kansas Speedway. A week later, MB Motorsports named Murphy as the driver of their No. 63 at Charlotte Motor Speedway. In 2021, Murphy joined Spencer Davis Motorsports for the Toyota Tundra 225.

Monster Jam
Murphy has been driving Monster Jam trucks since 2017, transitioning to the Bakugan Dragonoid truck in 2019, where he finished second in the freestyle and high jump events at Monster Jam World Finals XX.

Murphy is colloquially known as "Monster Jam Cam" in the series.

Personal life
After donating sponsorship space to the Ronald McDonald House Charities for a race in 2014, Murphy became an ambassador for the group in the Chicago region. He has volunteered for the charity dating back to 2012.

Murphy has taken up telling the story of another Illinois driver, Fred Lorenzen, to libraries around the state. 

Murphy is friends with NASCAR Cup Series driver Josh Bilicki due to them both growing up in the same area and their interest of racing.

Motorsports career results

NASCAR
(key) (Bold – Pole position awarded by qualifying time. Italics – Pole position earned by points standings or practice time. * – Most laps led.)

Xfinity Series

Camping World Truck Series

 Season still in progress 
 Ineligible for series points

References

External links
 
 Central State Region Super Cup bio

NASCAR drivers
Monster truck drivers
Racing drivers from Chicago
Racing drivers from Illinois
People from Itasca, Illinois
Living people
1996 births